Acraea guillemei is a butterfly in the family Nymphalidae which is native to deciduous woodlands in the southern subtropics of Africa.

Range
It is found in Angola, the Democratic Republic of the Congo (Haut-Lomami, Tanganika), north-western Zambia and western Tanzania.

Description

A. guillemei Oberth. (acutipennis Lathy) (55 c), as the figure shows, only differs from typical nohara in having the marginal band of the forewing somewhat widened at the apex, the marginal band of the hindwing broader, the discal dot in cellule 4 of the forewing not placed in a straight line with the dots in 5 and 6 and especially in having the discal dot in 3 of te hindwing placed midway between the marginal band and the base of the cellule. Angola and at Lake Tanganyika.

Biology
The habitat consists of deciduous forests.

Taxonomy
It is a member of the Acraea cepheus species group. See also Pierre & Bernaud, 2014

References

External links

Die Gross-Schmetterlinge der Erde 13: Die Afrikanischen Tagfalter. Plate XIII 55 c

Butterflies described in 1893
guillemei
Butterflies of Africa